The India cricket team toured Sri Lanka in July 2021 to play three One Day International (ODI) and three Twenty20 International (T20I) matches. The ODI series formed part of the inaugural 2020–2023 ICC Cricket World Cup Super League. All the matches took place at the R. Premadasa Stadium in Colombo. Originally, the tour was scheduled to take place in June 2020, but was moved back to August 2020 due to the COVID-19 pandemic, before being postponed. On 9 July 2021, following an outbreak of COVID-19 cases in the Sri Lankan camp, the series was postponed from 13 to 18 July.

The tour overlapped with India's participation in the 2021 ICC World Test Championship Final and a Test series against England. Therefore, the Board of Control for Cricket in India (BCCI) named Shikhar Dhawan and Bhuvneshwar Kumar as India's captain and vice-captain respectively for the matches against Sri Lanka. Sri Lanka Cricket (SLC) named Dasun Shanaka as the captain for tour, with their selectors releasing Kusal Perera from his captaincy role.

India won the first ODI by seven wickets, and then won the second ODI by three wickets, to take an unassailable lead in the series. Sri Lanka won the third ODI by three wickets, with India winning the series 2–1. India won the first T20I by 38 runs. The second T20I was postponed by one day, after India's Krunal Pandya tested positive for COVID-19. All eight of Pandya's close contacts tested negative for COVID-19, but were not allowed to travel to the ground for the final two matches. Sri Lanka won the second T20I by four wickets to level the series. Sri Lanka won the third T20I by seven wickets and won the series 2–1. It was the first time that Sri Lanka had won a T20I series against India. It was also Sri Lanka's first bilateral series win against India across all formats of international cricket since August 2008.

Background
In May 2020, Sri Lanka Cricket sent an email to the BCCI requesting for the series to be played in July 2020 due to the COVID-19 pandemic. It also suggest the possibility of playing the matches behind closed doors. The BCCI responded saying they were open to travelling to Sri Lanka, as long as there is no compromise to the wellbeing of their cricketers. However, they also stated that the tour was "close to impossible at present", and they would have to wait to see how the pandemic unfolds. On 18 May 2020, Ashley de Silva, the CEO of Sri Lanka Cricket, confirmed that the tour had not yet been postponed. At the end of May, Sri Lanka Cricket named a 13-man squad to begin training at the Colombo Cricket Club. In June 2020, the BCCI agreed to tour Sri Lanka in August 2020, subject to government permission. On 12 June 2020, the BCCI confirmed that it had called off the tour due to the pandemic.

In May 2021, BCCI President Sourav Ganguly confirmed that India would tour Sri Lanka to play five T20Is, although later the BCCI wanted to reduce it to a three-match series. However, as the tour may ease the financial loses faced due to COVID-19 pandemic by boosting Sri Lanka Cricket's revenue, the board asked the BCCI to play five T20Is instead of three. On 20 May 2021, the BCCI considered the request, and agreed to play five T20Is. However, on 10 June 2021, Sri Lanka Cricket confirmed the tour itinerary with only three T20Is. On 8 June 2021, Rahul Dravid was named as the head coach of India's team for the tour.

Squads

India did not name individual squads for the ODI and T20I matches, opting instead to name a combined squad of 20 players for the tour. Ishan Porel, Sandeep Warrier, Arshdeep Singh, Ravisrinivasan Sai Kishore, and Simarjeet Singh were also named as net bowlers. Prior to the second T20I match, all five net bowlers were added to India's squad, following the COVID-19 cases that resulted in the match being postponed. Krunal Pandya, Hardik Pandya, Suryakumar Yadav, Prithvi Shaw, Deepak Chahar, Krishnappa Gowtham, Ishan Kishan, and Yuzvendra Chahal were all placed into isolation and were ruled out of the final two matches of the tour.

Ahead of the series, Sri Lanka's Angelo Mathews requested not to take part in the tour due to personal reasons. On 9 July 2021, Sri Lanka named a preliminary squad of 25 players for the tour. As per India, Sri Lanka also did not name individual squads for each format, naming a combined squad of 24 players for the tour. Suminda Lakshan was added to Sri Lanka's T20I squad as cover for Wanindu Hasaranga, who suffered an injury in the third ODI. Prior to the second T20I match, Sadeera Samarawickrama was added to Sri Lanka's squad.

ODI series

1st ODI

2nd ODI

3rd ODI

T20I series

1st T20I

2nd T20I

3rd T20I

Statistics

Most runs (ODI)

Most wickets (ODI)

Most runs (T20I)

Most wickets (T20I)

South African cricket team in Sri Lanka in 2021

Notes

References

External links
 Series home at ESPN Cricinfo

2020 in Sri Lankan cricket
2021 in Sri Lankan cricket
2020 in Indian cricket
2021 in Indian cricket
International cricket competitions in 2021
Indian cricket tours of Sri Lanka
Cricket events postponed due to the COVID-19 pandemic